Melanio Asensio Montes (18 May 1936 – 14 January 2021) was a Spanish sprinter. He competed in the men's 200 metres at the 1960 Summer Olympics.

References

External links
 

1936 births
2021 deaths
Athletes (track and field) at the 1960 Summer Olympics
Spanish male sprinters
Olympic athletes of Spain